Hedley Hill is a small village in County Durham, in England. It is situated between Tow Law and Esh Winning.

References

Villages in County Durham